Georgios Marmaridis (21 November 1930 – 22 December 2005) was a Greek sports shooter and journalist. He competed in the 25 metre pistol and 50 metre pistol events at the 1960 Summer Olympics.

References

1930 births
2005 deaths
Greek male sport shooters
Olympic shooters of Greece
Shooters at the 1960 Summer Olympics
Panathinaikos shooters
Sportspeople from Athens
Greek writers
Greek journalists
20th-century journalists